"The Love in Your Eyes" is a song by American rock singer Eddie Money, from his album Nothing to Lose in 1988 (see 1988 in music). It was released as a single and reached number 24 on the Billboard Hot 100 and number one on the Billboard Album Rock Tracks chart. The song was written by Adrian Gurvitz, David Paul Bryant, and Steve Dubin.

See also
List of Billboard Mainstream Rock number-one songs of the 1980s

References 

1988 songs
1989 singles
Eddie Money songs
Songs written by Adrian Gurvitz
Columbia Records singles